The 2012–13 Coppin State Eagles men's basketball team represented Coppin State University during the 2012–13 NCAA Division I men's basketball season. The Eagles, led by 27th year head coach Fang Mitchell, played their home games at the Physical Education Complex and were members of the Mid-Eastern Athletic Conference. They finished the season 8–24, 5–11 in MEAC play to finish in a tie for ninth place. They lost in the first round of the MEAC tournament to Bethune-Cookman.

Roster

Schedule

|-
!colspan=9| Regular season

|-
!colspan=9| 2013 MEAC men's basketball tournament

References

Coppin State Eagles men's basketball seasons
Coppin State
Coppin State Eagles men's basketball team
Coppin State Eagles men's basketball team